Events from the year 1958 in Taiwan, Republic of China. This year is numbered Minguo 47 according to the official Republic of China calendar.

Incumbents 
 President – Chiang Kai-shek
 Vice President – Chen Cheng
 Premier – Yu Hung-Chun, Chen Cheng
 Vice Premier – Huang Shao-ku, Wang Yun-wu

Events

August
 23 August – Start of Second Taiwan Strait Crisis.

September
 22 September – End of Second Taiwan Strait Crisis.

October
 25 October – Mao Zedong issued a document through the Ministry of National Defense of PRC, Mao said,”There is only one China in the world and no two in China. We are consistent with this point. The Americans are compelled to create two Chinese tricks. The entire Chinese people, including you and overseas Chinese, are absolutely not allowed to realize them.”()

Births
 1 February – Lee Shu-chuan, Deputy Mayor of Kaohsiung
 11 March – Chou Hsi-wei, Magistrate of Taipei County (2005–2010)
 25 March – Sisy Chen, politician
 4 May – Sibelle Hu, former actress and singer
 14 May – Sarah Chen, singer
 20 June – Lee Wen-chung, Deputy Minister of Veterans Affairs Council
 10 July – Ho Min-hao, member of Legislative Yuan
 10 August – Wang Mei-hua, Vice Minister of Economic Affairs
 24 August – Liu Cheng-ying, Magistrate of Lienchiang County
 14 September – James C. F. Huang, Minister of Foreign Affairs (2006–2008)
 23 September – Lin Chung-chiu, baseball player
 31 October – Wellington Koo, Chairperson of Financial Supervisory Commission

Deaths
 15 March – Wang Ch'ung-hui, Premier (1922).

References

 
Years of the 20th century in Taiwan